Nkomo may refer to:

 John Nkomo (1934–2013), 3rd Second Vice-President of Zimbabwe (2009–2013)
 Joshua Nkomo (1917–1999), 1st Second Vice-President of Zimbabwe (1987–1999)
 Nkwenkwe Nkomo, an anti-apartheid student activist in the 1970s
 William Frederick Nkomo (1915–1972), a South African medical doctor, community leader, political activist and teacher

Bantu-language surnames